is a Japanese architect known for designing many museums in Japan. Compared with his contemporaries, Kuryu started his career later than other famous Japanese architects.

Kuryu graduated from Waseda University and once worked with Maki, a very famous architect, at Maki & Associates and then became an associate lecturer in Maki Research Department at the University of Tokyo. In 1987, he set up Akira Kuryu Architect & Associates. Since then, in such a short period, he has constantly worked out excellent projects, including a series of museum buildings, which are widely noticed by the public such as “Uemura Naomi memorial museum”(1994), Nagasaki National Peace Memorial Hall for the Atomic Bomb Victims (2003)…He was awarded many prizes of great worth such as The Prize of Architectural Institute of Japan, Award of the Japan Art Academy, Kenneth F. Brown Asia Pacific Culture and Architecture Design Award. With these successful architectural designs, Akira Kuryu has gained a fairy high reputation in the field of architecture in Japan.

Biography
1973 Graduated — from Graduate School of Architectural Planning, Waseda University. Joined Maki & Architects.

1979 — Established K Atelier, urban architectural design office Assistant, Department of Architecture, University of Tokyo

1983 — Left University of Tokyo; became president of K Atelier Studied in Europe for a year as international trainee commissioned 
by Agency of Cultural Affairs

1987 — Changed the company name to Kuryu & Architects; appointed representative director

1992 — Chiba University

Works

Carnival Showcase 1988
Uemura Naomi Memorial Museum 1994
Patrie+Kiyosato Museum of Photographic Arts (K*MoPA) 1995
Core Yamakuni (Amenity Town) 1996
Okazaki Mindscape Museum 1996
BYODOIN Museum HOSHOKAN: Temple Museum 2001
Memorial Academium of Toin Gakuen 2001
Nagasaki National Peace Memorial Hall for the Atomic Bomb Victims 2004
Shizuoka International Garden and Horticulture Exhibition+Hamanako Garden Park 2004

Sources
http://www.kuryu.com
http://www.nsknet.or.jp/westhill/designer/kuryu_profile1.htm

1947 births
Living people
Waseda University alumni
Academic staff of the University of Tokyo
Japanese architects